W.E. Powell was a 19th-century footballer who played for Burslem Port Vale.

Career
Powell most likely joined Burslem Port Vale in the autumn of 1884. His first recorded game was in a 6–1 thumping at Blackburn Olympic on 1 November 1884 in a friendly. The next year he was a member of the sides that won the Burslem Challenge and shared the North Staffs Charity Challenge cups in 1885. He was rather callously given the nickname "Pull-it" after badly disjointing a knee in a 4–1 defeat at Crewe Alexandra in a Football Combination match on 20 October 1888; the injury was so severe a doctor had to be brought onto the pitch before Powell was carried off. Once recovered he was mainly used as a reserve player and was released from the Athletic Ground at the end of the 1892–93 season.

Career statistics
Source:

Honours
Port Vale
Burslem Challenge Cup: 1885
North Staffordshire Charity Challenge Cup: 1885 (shared)

References

Year of birth missing
Year of death missing
English footballers
Association football goalkeepers
Association football defenders
Association football midfielders
Association football forwards
Port Vale F.C. players
English Football League players